Elections in Alderney are held for the positions both of President and Member of the States of Alderney. The President of the States of Alderney is directly elected every four years. Half of the ten States Members are elected every two years for a four-year mandate. In 2014 1,267 people were registered to vote. The whole island is a single constituency.

States Members 

To be elected between 14 November and 14 December for a four-year term, 5 candidates are elected every two years, which means that every four years the composition of the parliament changes completely. The election held on 6 December 2008, had a turnout of over 700 people produced a frequency of 65.6%.

President 

Election in November for a four-year term.

Voters 
Voters are eligible to be inscribed on the electoral roll of Alderney if they are: 
17 or over (being able to vote from the age 18);
have been ordinarily resident in Alderney for 12 months up to 15 October of the year in which inscription is requested;
are ordinarily resident in Alderney;
are not subject to a legal disability.

Absent voters may use a "Postal" or "Proxy" vote.

See also 

 Politics of Alderney
 States of Alderney Member

Notes and references

External links
Alderney Official Website
Alderney Elections
Government of Alderney Law, 2004